

Squamata
 Near Maastricht, the first Mosasaurus is discovered.

References

18th century in paleontology
Paleontology